Chaperone or Chaperon may refer to:

Chaperone (social) or chaperon, a person who accompanies or supervises young people on social occasions
Chaperone (clinical), a person who acts as a witness during a medical examination or procedure
Chaperon (headgear), a form of hood or hat worn in Western Europe in the Middle Ages

Biology
Chaperone (protein), a protein that assists non-covalent folding/unfolding
Co-chaperone, a protein that assists a chaperone in protein folding and other functions
Pharmacological chaperone, a molecule which stabilizes protein folding, used in treatment for loss of function
Chaperone-mediated autophagy, a selective type of autophagy
MEAI or "Chaperon", a pharmaceutical drug used as a safer alternative to alcohol

People
 Bob Chaperon (born 1958), a retired Canadian snooker and billiards player
 Nicolas Chaperon (died 1656), a French painter, draughtsman and engraver
 Philippe Chaperon (1823–1907), a French scenographer

See also
Chaperonin
The Chaperone (disambiguation)